Dominic Turner is an Australian blues guitarist, vocalist and key songwriter for the Australian blues band The Backsliders. Dom also has a number of solo projects including 'Dom Turner and Supro' and 'Dom Turner and the Nationals'. In 2002, Dom along with Rob Hirst, formed the band Angry Tradesman.

He specialises in "bottle neck" slide guitar using resonator guitars as well as 6 and 12 string acoustic and electric guitars. Dom's session guitar work can be heard on a variety of Australia albums, such as Rob Hirst's (from Midnight Oil and also the drummer in The Backsliders) Ghostwriters Second Skin album. Dom's influences are many and varied – a blend of delta blues, piedmont blues, rock, dub and sounds of Asia.

He is a highly regarded speaker on blues and roots music and has guested on ABC (Australian Broadcasting Corporation) radio programs and presented music workshops at festivals and in universities (both nationally and internationally). He has also contributed songs for the ABC's television show Sea Change.

In 2004, Dom was voted Songwriter of the Year at the Australian Blues Awards in Goulburn, NSW and has a sculpture in recognition of this honour at the Goulburn Visitors Centre.

Albums
The Backsliders
2016 - Heathen Songbook
2014 - Dark Side
2011 - Starvation Box
2009 - Throwbacks
2007 - Left Field Holler
2005 - Live
2003 - Live at the Basement (DVD)
2002 - Hanoi
1999 - Poverty Deluxe
1998 - Downtime (A Ten Year Collection Of Backsliders Music)
1995 - Wide Open
1993 - Live at the Royal
1991 - Hellhound
1989 - Sitting on a Million
1988 - Preaching Blues

Dom Turner and Supro
2000 - Electro Vee

Kim Sinh and Dom Turner
2012 - Two Days in Hanoi

Dom Turner and Ian Collard
2012 - Mama Says We're Crazy Too

References

Living people
Year of birth missing (living people)
Australian blues guitarists
Australian male guitarists
Australian songwriters